Statistics of the USFSA Football Championship in the 1919 season.

1/8 Final
Alliance vélo sport d'Auxerre 5–0 Racing club bourguignon Dijon
Olympique de Marseille 16–0 SPMSA Romans 
RC Paris 2–1 SS Romilly
Club Sportif et Malouin Servannais 4–0 Club sportif d'Alençon
Club Olympique Choletais 1–1 AS limousine Poitiers  
Stade Bordelais UC 6–0 Stadoceste tarbais
Le Havre AC 2–0 Stade vélo club Abbeville
Club Sportif des Terreaux – CAS Montluçon (Montluçon forfeited)

Quarterfinals  
Club sportif des Terreaux 3–1 Alliance vélo sport d'Auxerre
Olympique de Marseille 2–1 Stade Bordelais UC  
Le Havre AC 1–0 RC Paris 
Club Sportif et Malouin Servannais – Club Olympique Choletais (Cholet forfeited)

Semifinals  
Olympique de Marseille 1–1 Club sportif des Terreaux
Le Havre AC 4–0 Club Sportif et Malouin Servannais

Final

Le Havre AC 4–1 Olympique de Marseille

References
RSSF

USFSA Football Championship
1
France